Albert Edward Dickin (11 January 1901 – 5 May 1955) was a British freestyle swimmer and diver who competed in the 1920 Summer Olympics, 1924 Summer Olympics, and 1928 Summer Olympics.

In 1920 he was eliminated in the first round of the 100-metre freestyle event as well as of the plain high diving competition. Four years later he finished fifth with the British team in the 4×200-metre freestyle relay. In the 100-metre freestyle event as well as of the plain high diving competition he was eliminated in the first round again. At the 1928 Games he was a member of the British team which finished sixth in the 4×200-metre freestyle relay contest.

His brother Jack Dickin also swam the 100-metre freestyle event in the 1920 Summer Olympics.

References

External links
Albert Dickin's profile at Sports Reference.com

1901 births
1955 deaths
English male freestyle swimmers
Olympic swimmers of Great Britain
Olympic divers of Great Britain
Swimmers at the 1920 Summer Olympics
Swimmers at the 1924 Summer Olympics
Swimmers at the 1928 Summer Olympics
Divers at the 1920 Summer Olympics
Divers at the 1924 Summer Olympics